Lomatium ciliolatum is a species of flowering plant in the carrot family known by the common name Yolla Bolly biscuitroot. It is endemic to California, where it is known from the mountain ranges adjacent to the north and south of the San Francisco Bay Area, at 300–600 feet, 1200–2100 m. It is often a member of the serpentine soils flora in woodland and chaparral habitat.

Description
Lomatium ciliolatum is a perennial herb growing 10 to 30 centimeters long from a taproot. It generally lacks a stem, producing hairy, clumpy or spreading leaves and inflorescences from ground level. The leaves are up to 7 centimeters long and divided into many highly divided leaflets with narrow lobes. The inflorescence is topped with an umbel of yellowish or purplish flowers.

See also
California montane chaparral and woodlands

References

External links
Jepson Manual Treatment – Lomatium ciliolatum
USDA Plants Profile
Lomatium ciliolatum – Photo gallery

ciliolatum
Endemic flora of California
Natural history of the California chaparral and woodlands
Natural history of the San Francisco Bay Area